Southwest High School (known as Southwest or SHS) is a 4 year public high school in El Centro, California that serves approximately 2,085 students to its diverse population. Southwest is one of the 3 high schools within the Central Union High School District. It has been a California Distinguished School.

Music Programs
 Women's Choir
 Men's Choir
 Ladies' Ensemble
 SAVAPA Music
 Concert Band
 Jazz Band
 Marching Band
 Guitar
 Orchestra (Cadet, Philharmonic, Chamber)
Orange juice

Athletics
SHS competes in the Imperial Valley League in the California Interscholastic Federation San Diego Section. The school's teams are called the Eagles

Fall Sports
 Cross Country (JV, Varsity) (Co-ed)
 American Football (Frosh, JV, Varsity)
 Girls Volleyball (Frosh, JV, Varsity)
 Girls Tennis (JV, Varsity)
Girls Golf (JV, Varisity)

Winter Sports
 Soccer (Frosh, JV, Varsity)
 Basketball (Frosh, JV, Varsity)
 Wrestling (Frosh, JV, Varsity)
 Girls Basketball (Frosh, JV, Varsity)

Spring Sports
 Baseball (Frosh, JV, Varsity)
 Softball (Frosh, JV, Varsity)
 Track (JV, Varsity)
 Swim (Frosh, JV, Varsity)
 Boys Tennis (JV, Varsity)
Boys Golf (JV, Varsity)

Yearly
Cheerleading (JV, Varsity)

Graduation Requirements
Southwest High School and the Central Union High School District follow the (A-G) requirements which are 

220 Credits
2.0 Grade Point Average or above from grades 9 through 12 (Freshman, Sophomore, Junior, Senior) Year.
MUST pass the California High School Exit Exam (CAHSEE) with a 350 or above in order to graduate.
English – 8 Semesters (4 Years) (40 credits)
-English 9               -English 10

-English 11             -English 12

 Social Science – 6 Semesters (3 Years) (30 credits)
-World History      1 year (2 Semesters)  (10th grade)

-US History         1 year (2 Semesters) (11th grade)

-American Government    1 semester       (12th grade)

-Economics        1 semester        (12th grade)

Mathematics – 4 Semesters (20 credits)
Two years with 1 year being Algebra 
-Algebra 1               -Geometry
-Algebra 2  (optional),            -Trigonometry (optional),
-AP Stats   (optional),            -Pre-Calculus (optional),
-AP Calculus (optional)

Science – 4 Semesters (2 Years) (20 credits)
-Physical Science   1 year (2 Semesters)

-Biology  1 year (2 Semesters)
-Chemistry (optional)         -Physics (optional)
-AP Chemistry (optional)      -AP Biology (optional)

Physical Education – 4 Semesters (2 Years)(20 credits)
All 9th grade students must be enrolled in PE. 
-P.E 1                -P.E 2
-Weight Lifting (Training)

Fine Arts – 2 Semesters (1 Years)(10 credits)
-Satisfied by any combination of Art, Music, Drama and/or Foreign Language.

Practical Arts – 1 Semester (5 credits)
-Satisfied by a course in business education, industrial arts, life skills or ROP.

 Academic Elective – 2 Semesters(2 Years) (10 credits)
-From the following areas:  (Mathematics, Science, Social Science, Foreign Language, and/or Language Arts.)

Health Education - 1 Semester
Computer Information Literacy - 1 Semester

References

High schools in Imperial County, California
El Centro, California
Public high schools in California
1996 establishments in California